The Homorodul Mare is the right headwater of the river Homorod in Romania. At its confluence with the river Homorodul Mic in the village Homorod, the river Homorod is formed. It flows through the villages Băile Homorod, Comănești, Aldea, Mărtiniș, Rareș, Sânpaul, Petreni, Orășeni, Ionești, Drăușeni, Cața and Homorod.

References

Rivers of Romania
Rivers of Brașov County
Rivers of Harghita County